The Siuslaw National Forest is a national forest in western Oregon in the United States.  Established in 1908, the Siuslaw is made up of a wide variety of ecosystems, ranging from coastal forests to sand dunes.

Geography 

The Siuslaw National Forest encompasses more than  along the central Oregon Coast between Coos Bay and Tillamook, and in some places extends east from the ocean, beyond the crest of the Oregon Coast Range, almost reaching the Willamette Valley. The forest lies primarily in Lane County (39% of the forest) and Lincoln County (27% of the forest); the rest in descending order of land area are Tillamook, Douglas, Yamhill, Benton, Coos, and Polk counties. It includes the Sand Lake Recreation Area and the Oregon Dunes National Recreation Area.

Numerous aquatic habitats are found in the forest: marine shore, rivers and streams—, including the Alsea, Nestucca, Siuslaw, and Umpqua rivers—and 30 lakes. The terrestrial environment can be regarded as two major vegetation zones, one near the coast dominated by Sitka spruce (Picea sitchensis), and the other dominated by western hemlock (Tsuga heterophylla) and Douglas fir (Pseudotsuga menziesii). Western hemlock often grows in the shade under Douglas fir. Other major tree species in the forest are western red cedar (Thuja plicata), red alder (Alnus rubra), and bigleaf maple (Acer macrophyllum). The Cummins Creek Wilderness and the Rock Creek Wilderness preserve some of this old growth.

Recreational activities 
Recreational activities in the Siuslaw National Forest include fishing, camping, hiking, horseback riding, mountain biking, exploring tide pools, and riding off highway vehicles.

Wilderness areas 
There are three officially designated wilderness areas within the Siuslaw National Forest that are part of the National Wilderness Preservation System, all established in 1984:

 Drift Creek Wilderness - Lincoln County
 Cummins Creek Wilderness - Lane County
 Rock Creek Wilderness - Lane County

See also 
 Beaver Creek Falls in the heart of the forest

References

External links
 Siuslaw National Forest official website
 

 
National Forests of Oregon
Protected areas of Benton County, Oregon
Protected areas of Douglas County, Oregon
Protected areas of Coos County, Oregon
Protected areas of Lane County, Oregon
Protected areas of Lincoln County, Oregon
Protected areas of Polk County, Oregon
Protected areas of Tillamook County, Oregon
Protected areas of Yamhill County, Oregon
1908 establishments in Oregon
Oregon Coast Range
Protected areas established in 1908